Kaikoura Airport  is an uncontrolled aerodrome located  southwest of Kaikoura at Peketa in the South Island of New Zealand.

History
The Airport was opened in 1964. It was constructed by council staff at a cost of 4000 pounds.
In 1983, the Kaikoura Aero Club was formed. In late 1995, the runway was sealed for the increased traffic and to protect it from damage caused by rabbits.

In 1990–91, Air Charter Ltd operated scheduled flights to Christchurch using Cessna 210 aircraft. On 19 July 2004, Sounds Air started twice daily services from Wellington using its Airvan aircraft. But these also ended as of May 2009 as they were not a success.

On 21 November 2016, Sounds Air began a temporary daily Monday to Friday air service from Kaikoura to Blenheim and Christchurch, after the main transport links to the town were severed by the 2016 Kaikoura earthquake. The service was planned to run for at least three weeks, using the company's Cessna Caravan. It was extended to the end of December 2017.

Wings Over Whales, a scenic flight operator based at Kaikoura offers whale watching and other charter flights.

Airlines and destinations

Operational information 
Airfield elevation:  AMSL
Runway 05/23:  bitumen PCN 18
Runway 05/23:  grass ESWL 1090

The aerodrome is operated by Kaikoura District Council and is available for general use without the permission of the operator.

See also

 List of airports in New Zealand
 List of airlines of New Zealand
 Transport in New Zealand

References 

Airports in New Zealand
Transport in Canterbury, New Zealand
Kaikōura
Transport buildings and structures in Canterbury, New Zealand